The 1981 DFB-Pokal Final decided the winner of the 1980–81 DFB-Pokal, the 38th season of Germany's knockout football cup competition. It was played on 2 May 1981 at the Neckarstadion in Stuttgart. Eintracht Frankfurt won the match 3–1 against 1. FC Kaiserslautern, to claim their 3rd cup title.

Route to the final
The DFB-Pokal began with 128 teams in a single-elimination knockout cup competition. There were a total of six rounds leading up to the final. Teams were drawn against each other, and the winner after 90 minutes would advance. If still tied, 30 minutes of extra time was played. If the score was still level, a replay would take place at the original away team's stadium. If still level after 90 minutes, 30 minutes of extra time was played. If the score was still level, a penalty shoot-out was used to determine the winner.

Note: In all results below, the score of the finalist is given first (H: home; A: away).

Match

Details

References

External links
 Match report at kicker.de 
 Match report at WorldFootball.net
 Match report at Fussballdaten.de 

Eintracht Frankfurt matches
1. FC Kaiserslautern matches
1980–81 in German football cups
1981
Sports competitions in Stuttgart
20th century in Stuttgart
May 1981 sports events in Europe